Pelekh (lit. Spindle) is a kibbutz in northern Israel. Located in the Lower Galilee near Karmiel, it falls under the jurisdiction of Misgav Regional Council.

History
The village was founded in 1982 by a gar'in of Hashomer Hatzair members. It takes its name from a verse in the Book of Proverbs (31:19) together with the nearby kibbutz Kishorit, whose name appears the same sentence.

In its early years, the core families, immigrants from the former USSR, ran a chicken coop, cow shed and kiwi plantation.

References

Kibbutzim
Kibbutz Movement
Populated places established in 1982
Populated places in Northern District (Israel)
1982 establishments in Israel